Kiveh Nan (also Romanized as Kīveh Nān and Keyveh Nān; also known as Kīvanān, Kīvenān, and Kīyānān) is a village in Kivanat Rural District, Kolyai District, Sonqor County, Kermanshah Province, Iran. At the 2006 census, its population was 327, in 87 families.

References 

Populated places in Sonqor County